Millennium Square is a location in the centre of Bristol, England. It was built as part of the At Bristol development, and has become a popular public area.

Attractions
Millennium Square is home to a BBC Big Screen and a large water feature. A bronze statue of Bristol-born actor Cary Grant by sculptor Graham Ibbeson was unveiled by Grant's widow in 2001.  Other bronze sculptures include William Penn, William Tyndale and Thomas Chatterton, all three by Lawrence Holofcener. There are also a number of small painted bronze Jack Russell terrier dogs by Cathie Pilkington, some of which are set into the paved surface, as if they were swimming.

References

See also
 List of public art in Bristol

Bristol Harbourside
Squares in Bristol
Outdoor sculptures in England